Percy Goetschius (August 10, 1853 – October 29, 1943) was an American music theorist and teacher who won international fame in the teaching of composition.

Career
Goetschius was born in Paterson, New Jersey. He was encouraged by Ureli Corelli Hill, a conductor and violinist, who was a friend of the Goetschius family. Goetschius was the organist of the Second Presbyterian Church from 1868 to 1870 and of the First Presbyterian from 1870 to 1873, and pianist of Mr. Benson's Paterson Choral Society. He went to Stuttgart, Württemberg (Germany), in 1873 to study theory in the Royal Conservatory with Immanuel Faisst, and soon advanced to become a professor. In 1885, King Karl Friedrich Alexander of Württemberg conferred upon him the title of royal professor. He composed much, and reviewed performances for the press. Syracuse University conferred an Honorary Music Doctorate on Goetschius for the academic year 1892–1893. In 1892, he took a position in the New England Conservatory, Boston, and four years later opened a studio in that city. In 1905, he went to the staff of the Institute of Musical Art (Juilliard School) in New York City, headed by Frank Damrosch.

Goetschius's notable pupils include Henry Cowell, Lillian Fuchs, Howard Hanson, Swan Hennessy, Julia Klumpke, Wallingford Riegger, Bernard Rogers, Alice Marion Shaw, Carrie Burpee Shaw and Arthur Shepherd. In 1917, he was elected an honorary member of Phi Mu Alpha Sinfonia fraternity, the national fraternity for men in music, by the fraternity's Alpha chapter at the New England Conservatory.

Selected music theory textbooks
Goetschius published several textbooks on theory, including:

 The Material Used in Musical Composition (New York: G. Schirmer)
 1st ed. (1882); 
 2nd ed. (alternate link) (1889)
 4th ed. (1895)
 8th ed. (1907); 
 14th ed.

 The Theory and Practice of Tone-Relations (Boston: New England Conservatory, 1892); 
 11th ed. New York: G. Schirmer (1913); 
 15th ed. (1917)
 24th ed., New York: G. Schirmer (1931); 

 Models of the Principal Musical Forms (Boston: New England Conservatory, 1892); 
 Lessons in Music Form, Boston: Oliver Ditson (1904)
 Exercises in Melody Writing (New York: G. Schirmer)
 1st ed. (1900); 
 2nd ed. (1903)
 ?? ed. (1905); 
 6th ed. (1908)
 7th ed. (1910)
 11th ed. (1923)
 ?? ed. (1928); 

 The Larger Forms of Musical Composition (New York: G. Schirmer)
 5th ed. (1915); 
 7th ed. (1915); 

 The Homophonic Forms of Musical Composition (New York: G. Schirmer)
 1st ed. (1898)
 ? ed. (1901); 
 3rd ed. (1905)
 3rd ed. (1908)
 4th ed. (1907); 
 7th ed. (1913)
 8th ed. (1915); 
 9th ed. (1918); 
 10th ed. (1921)
 11th ed. (1923)

 Music Theory for Piano Students, co-authored with Clarence Grant Hamilton, John P. Marshall, Will Earhart (Boston: Oliver Ditson)
 (1924); 
 ?? (1930)

 Exercises in Elementary Counterpoint (G. Schirmer)
 5th ed. (1910); 

 Counterpoint (New York: G. Schirmer, 1930)
 The Structure of Music (Philadelphia: T. Presser, 1934)

As of the mid-20th century, use of Goetschius' books, as texts, is rare; albeit, the books contain original theoretical ideas and pedagogical approaches that endure today.

Goetschius' theory of harmonic progression
Perhaps the most important theory put forth by Goetschius is that of natural harmonic progression, which first appeared in The Theory and Practice of Tone-Relations. According to Goetschius' theory, the triad V in a key resolves to the tonic triad I because of the acoustically perfect interval of the fifth between the root of V and that of I:

Goetschius believed that, since the upper tone of the fifth is a harmonic of the lower, a chord rooted on the upper tone demands to be "resolved" by progressing to the chord rooted on the lower tone. Moreover, this theory is extended to other chords in a key, so that the normal tendency of a chord (triad or seventh chord) in a key is to progress to the chord rooted a fifth lower.

The sole weakness of this theory is its failure to account for the importance of the subdominant triad IV, a chord frequently used in musical practice. Although Goetschius acknowledges the importance of the IV harmony elsewhere in his writings, it does not appear to have a place in his theory of harmonic progression.

Family

He was married twice, the second time to Maria C. C. Stephany on June 14, 1899. He had two children.

Percy Goetschius died at his home in Manchester, New Hampshire on October 29, 1943.

References

General
 Percy Goetschius, Theorist and Teacher (Ph.D. dissertation), by Mother Catherine Agnes Carroll, RSCJ (1910–1996), Eastman School of Music (1961); <div style="margin-left:2em">Note: Mother Carroll had been a long-standing music professor at Manhattanville College
 A History of Harmonic Theory in the United States, by David M. Thompson (PhD) (born 1951), Kent State University Press (1980); <div style="margin-left:2em">As of 2017, Thompson is Chair of the Music Department at Marian University, Fond du Lac, Wisconsin, where he teaches music theory, history, music administration, and American music

Inline citations

External links
 
 
 

1853 births
1943 deaths
19th-century American composers
19th-century American male musicians
19th-century classical composers
20th-century American composers
20th-century American male musicians
20th-century classical composers
American classical composers
American male classical composers
American male writers
American people of Swiss descent
American textbook writers
Classical musicians from New Jersey
Juilliard School faculty
Musicians from Paterson, New Jersey
New England Conservatory faculty
State University of Music and Performing Arts Stuttgart alumni
Academic staff of the State University of Music and Performing Arts Stuttgart